Webuild SpA (formerly Salini Impregilo SpA) is an Italian industrial group specialised in the construction and civil engineering. The company was formally founded in 2014 as the result of the merger by incorporation of Salini into Impregilo. Salini Impregilo is the largest Italian engineering and general contractor group and a global player in the construction sector.

The company is active in over 50 countries of 5 continents (Africa, America, Asia, Europe, Oceania) with 35,000 employees. Its experience ranges from the construction of dams, hydroelectric plants and hydraulic structures, water infrastructures and ports, to roads, motorways, railways, metro systems and underground works, to airports, hospitals and public and industrial buildings, to civil engineering for waste-to-energy plants and environmental protection initiatives. It takes first place in the water sector of the Engineering News-Record rankings, the benchmark for the entire construction industry.

The company is listed on the Milan Stock Exchange.  It is directed by Pietro Salini.

History

In 2011 Salini, privately held, began its acquisition of Impregilo with an initial purchase of shares, reaching 25% the following year. The acquisition set a precedent in Italy because it was the first proxy fight for control of a company to occur in the country. Despite the opposition it faced from a group of investors, Salini managed to convince enough shareholders at an assembly in July 2012 to approve its proposal to replace Impregilo’s board of directors with its own list of candidates. Once in place, these new members of the board approved Salini’s offer to buy the rest of Impregilo. Pietro Salini became chief executive. A few months later, the board approved Salini’s plan.

In 2013, Salini launched a tender offer to buy the remaining ordinary shares in Impregilo. In January 2014 the transaction was completed forming Salini Impregilo.

On 18 December 2018, Marco Bucci, the mayor of Genoa and commissioner overseeing the reconstruction of the bridge over the Polcevera River announced the selection of Salini Impregilo and Fincantieri Infrastructure, via a new company called PERGENOVA, for the reconstruction of the bridge according to a design by Renzo Piano.

In May 2020, the company was rebranded as Webuild. In November 2020, Webuild acquired a 65% shareholding in Astaldi. In November 2022, WeBuild announced that, subject to due diligence, it would acquire Clough Group.

Operations
The company undertakes the following types of works: dams, hydroelectric power plants, railways, tunnels, undergrounds, bridges, viaducts, highways, roads, ports, airports and prestigious residential and office complexes. The Group operates in more than 50 countries on 5 continents and has 35,000 employees. It is organised into four business areas: Dams, hydroelectric plants and hydraulic works; Motorways and airports; Railways and undergrounds; Civil and industrial buildings.

With more than a century of engineering experience among the two founding companies, Salini and Impregilo, The company's track record includes 257 dams and hydroelectric plants;  of railway lines;  of underground works, 400 of which subway lines;  of roads and highways; and 350 bridges and viaducts.

Sustainability Rating 
The sustainability rating assigned to the company by Standard Ethics Aei is E+ (Very Low).

Major projects
Projects in which the company has been involved include buildings, public utilities, motorways, underground works, airports, water supply systems, waste disposals, hospitals and land development. Some major examples include:

 the Kariba Dam, Zimbabwe/Zambia, 1959
 the Dez Dam, Iran, 1963
 the Akosombo Dam, Ghana, 1966
 the salvage of the Abu Simbel temples, Egypt, 1968
 the bay of Fontvieille, Monaco, 1973
 the Tarbela Dam, Pakistan, 1976
 the Fréjus Road Tunnel, France/Italy, 1980
 the Trans-Gabon Railway, Gabon, 1982 
 the San Roque González de Santa Cruz Bridge, Argentina/Paraguay, 1990 
 the New Hemicycle of European Parliament, France, 1997
 the Lesotho Highlands Water Project, 1998
 extensions to the Rodovia dos Imigrantes, Brazil, 2002
 the Ghazi Barotha Dam, Pakistan, 2002
 the Nathpa Jhakri Hydroelectric Power Project, India, 2003
 the Sheikh Zayed Mosque, United Arab Emirates, 2003
 the Desalination plant Jebel Ali l1, United Arab Emirates, 2005
 the Kárahnjúkar Hydropower Plant, Iceland, 2008
 the Turin–Milan and Bologna–Florence high-speed railways, Italy, 2009
 the expansion of the Churchill Hospital in Oxford, 2009
the Grand Ethiopian Renaissance Dam, 2011
 the expansion of the Panama Canal – third set of locks, 2016
 the Faido sections of the Gotthard Base Tunnel, 2016
 the Cityringen, new subway circular urban line in Copenhagen, 2019
 Red Line North, part of the Doha Metro project in Qatar, 2019.
 the Texas Central Railway, due to complete in 2025
 the Rogun Dam, Tajikistan, due to complete in 2025
 portions of the Grand Paris Express, France, due to complete in 2025

See also
Strait of Messina Bridge

References

External links

Eurolink web site

Construction and civil engineering companies of Italy
Multinational companies headquartered in Italy
Companies based in Milan
Construction and civil engineering companies established in 1959
Companies listed on the Borsa Italiana
Strait of Messina Bridge
Italian companies established in 1959
Abu Simbel